The Transportation Technology Center (TTC) is a railroad equipment testing and training facility located northeast of Pueblo, Colorado, owned by the Federal Railroad Administration (FRA). It was built in 1971 as the High Speed Ground Test Center (HSGTC) for the Department of Transportation (DOT) and its original purpose was to test several hovertrain concepts. When those projects were completed in the 1970s, the site was handed to the FRA.

Since October 2022, operations at the TTC have been managed by ENSCO, Inc. (ENSCO) under a "Indefinite Duration, Indefinite Quantity" (IDIQ) contract establishing responsibility for research and development, testing, engineering, and training services at the TTC.

History

Site selection
Two United States Department of Commerce initiatives are credited with the genesis of the HSGTC: the Northeast Corridor Transportation Project (1964) and the High Speed Ground Transportation Act of 1965, which created the Office of High Speed Ground Transportation (OHSGT). OHSGT was absorbed by the FRA, part of the DOT, following that agency's creation in 1967. At the time, OHSGT, whose charter was to research and develop high speed rail transit, was investigating the use of magnetic or air cushion levitation of rail vehicles, but there were no suitable test sites. The 1968 amendment to the High Speed Ground Transportation Act authorized the Secretary of Transportation to acquire a test site. A proposed test site was investigated at the former Lowry Air Force Base near Denver, Colorado, but abandoned as the terrain was too rough; further site evaluation led the United States Secretary of Transportation to select the site for HSGTC near Pueblo in December 1969.

Secretary John A. Volpe officially designated the site in January 1970; a 50-year lease was signed by the DOT and the State of Colorado on August 22, 1970. The state land board acquired several small parcels to assemble a contiguous site, and under the terms of the lease, the cost was $10 and had two renewal options. Grading, soil stabilization, and storm drain construction began that August. The first extension has been exercised and the lease has been extended through August 22, 2070.

Initial construction
The first track to be started onsite was an initial  segment of the planned Linear Induction Motor Research Vehicle (LIMRV) test track, built by Morrison-Knudsen; it was anticipated that the initial segment would later be extended to a full  oval and a parallel oval guideway would be completed for the Tracked Air Cushion Research Vehicle (TACRV).

The initial segment of the LIMRV Test Track and a temporary Maintenance Shed were completed in April 1971; the HSGTC was dedicated on May 19, 1971, marked by a ceremony and ridealong by Secretary Volpe in the LIMRV. Although the FRA retained overall management of the facility, other government agencies were encouraged to participate, and the Urban Mass Transportation Administration (UMTA) constructed the Rapid Transit Test Track (TTT) onsite to test transit cars; the initial  segment of a planned  oval was started in March 1971 and completed in August by Morrison-Knudsen. The remaining  were completed in September 1972 and checked on September 8 using locomotive DOTX 001 and two NYCTA R42 subway cars. DOTX 001 was a  GE U30C locomotive, the first rolling stock purchased for the HSGTC in FY1971. It is now retired and in the collection of the Pueblo Railway Museum. The R42 cars were designated Test Car T-2 and T-3.

The TTT was dedicated on October 12, 1972, during a ceremony that also included the unveiling of the State-of-the-Art Car (SOAC); the principal speaker was Secretary Volpe. By 1972, plans to complete the LIMRV test track oval had been dropped, although a similarly sized oval would be built for the TACRV guideway, and plans for an  oval guideway for the UTACV had been added. In addition to SOAC testing, other early tests conducted at HSGTC included the evaluation of the US Standard Light Rail Vehicle (US SLRV). TTT initially offered testing with an electrified third rail; overhead catenary wire was added to TTT in summer 1975 to test the US SLRV.

Temporary site headquarters and personnel offices initially were set up in five trailers to support early testing; the Program Management Building (PMB) was the first permanent structure to be completed, housing administrative personnel, designed by Bertrum Bruton Associates (of Denver); the PMB was completed and occupied in February 1972. The East Auto Overpass was completed in July 1972, spanning the LIMRV test track. The Rail Dynamics Laboratory (RDL), the first laboratory building onsite, was designed by Wyle Laboratories in 1970 and construction began in July 1972, by Houston Construction/Wilkins Construction. A well and water storage tank were completed in January 1973. Work on the Center Services Building (CSB) began in 1973, and design of an Operations building also started that year to relieve overcrowding in the PMB. The RDL was completed and occupied by April 1974, but the simulator had not yet been installed; multiple issues with development led to the simulator being redesigned to a double-ended vertical shaker and separate rolling unit without vibration. The CSB and Ops building were completed in January and August 1975, respectively.

Renaming

The LIMRV set a world record for rail vehicle speed at HSGTC on August 14, 1974, . The site had cost $55 million to construct to-date, and plans were advancing to continue research on hovertrains. Meanwhile, the first  segment of TACRV guideway was completed in March 1973, and a second segment of equal length was completed in November 1973. The UTACV program selected Rohr to build a Prototype Tracked Air Cushion Vehicle (PTACV), and construction of an inverted-T guideway began in May 1973.

However, the high-speed aspect of rail transportation began to be de-emphasized and the HSGTC was renamed to the Transportation Test Center (TTC) in December 1974 to reflect its new mission. Work on the high-speed loop was started in 1975. A static facility was added to test tank car thermal insulation, named the Tank Car Torch Test Facility.

The Facility for Accelerated Service Testing (FAST) is a dedicated facility to study wear and fatigue of railroad track; it first was recommended in September 1975. Tracks were laid for FAST within the RTT loop at TTC starting in spring 1976 and the first train began operating over the FAST loop on September 22, 1976. In 1988, 125-ton cars were added to consists, better reflecting actual loads and capacities in the United States. This change was implemented as the Heavy Axle Load (HAL) program.

In Fiscal Year 1995, the TTC received its most recent name change to the Transportation Technology Center, reflecting "a major consolidation of activities and broadening of functions conducted at TTC".

Public-private partnership
Operations and maintenance (O&M) of the site typically has been supported by a contractor since the first permanent buildings were completed; a request for proposals was issued in Fiscal Year 1971, soliciting bids for an operations contractor, which would support test contractors, provide test track maintenance, and housekeeping services. The first O&M contractor was Kentron-Hawaii, Ltd., starting from July 1972. Dynelectron won a competitive re-bid for the O&M contract in 1976. Due to reduced funding that threatened to close the facility, the FRA entered a public-private partnership with AAR in October 1982, who would take over "care, custody, and control" of TTC. AAR consolidated its Research & Test Department at TTC from 1995 to 1997 and formed its TTCI subsidiary to administer the contract on January 1, 1998 and the contract has been renewed periodically as a single-source award since then.

In March 2021, the FRA awarded the "care, custody, and control" contract to ENSCO, Inc., who will assume responsibility for operations and maintenance of TTC. In addition, ENSCO will expand the use of TTC to support more general ground transportation research.

Facility

The Transportation Technology Center occupies a  site northeast of Pueblo, Colorado and just north of the US Army's Pueblo Chemical Depot. The tracks are designed to replicate conditions seen on service environments, varying from precisely engineered high-speed tracks to track intentionally designed with irregularities.

Tracks and guideways
The RTT is used to test the performance and endurance of vehicles at high speeds. The track has one  radius curve, four  radius curves, and a balloon loop to turn trains around and test a tighter curve. The RTT also has a section of track called the High Speed Adjustable Perturbation Slab (HS-APS) or Precision Geometry Slab Track, which can be adjusted to introduce irregularities.
It was initially built for the UMTA as the Rapid Transit Test Track and is completely contained within the RTT. It incorporates six different types of construction to simulate track conditions at various rail transit agencies, with grades ranging up to 1.4665%.
The TTT also has a section of track called the Tight Turn Loop (also known as the "screech loop"), with a  radius, used to investigate wheel noise and car curving performance.
Facility for Accelerated Service Testing (FAST): Initially completed in 1976 as a  test loop, then split in 1983 to form the HTL and WRM.
High Tonnage Loop (HTL):  loop designed to quickly test both rolling stock and track components, such as rail, ties, switches, ballast, and bridges. The equipment used is on loan from AAR member railroads, and the program is funded by AAR member railroads and railroad suppliers often contribute their components for testing. Since 1976, the FAST program has operated up to 140-million gross tons per year over the HTL. 
Wheel/Rail Mechanism Track (WRM):  loop designed to test vehicle performance over track that has several different types of curves and intentional irregularities designed to induce poor performance.
Precision Test Track (PTT):  segment designed with intentional irregularities to test vehicles for dynamic pitch and bounce, dynamic twist and roll, and dynamic yaw and sway. It was initially used as the LIMRV Test Track.
Train Dynamics Track (TDT) and the Impact Facility or Impact Track: Track designed for crash-testing to determine crashworthiness and crash energy management. Facility is built to withstand loads of 3,000,000 lbs as vehicles impact a stationary object. Two trains can also be crashed into each other at the facility. Other sections of the TDT evaluate rail vehicle dynamic responses to grades, curves, switches, humps, and yard tracks.

In addition, there are two leftover guideways constructed during the HSGTC period:
 Tracked Levitated Air Cushion Vehicle Guideway: U-shaped concrete channel, used between 1973 and 1976.

Buildings and structures

In addition to the test tracks, there are several buildings at the site.
  Operations Building (OPS) and  Project Management Building (PMB): administrative offices, including the center's cafeteria.
Two bridge cranes are used to move rail vehicles between the two machines. The high bay at RDL measures  (L×W×H)
  Center Services Building (CSB): includes equipment for maintenance and repair of rail vehicles and test equipment, including a wheel truing machine.
  Warehouse (WLF) and Components Test Lab (CTL): mechanical, metallurgical, instrumentation, and metrology laboratories. The two buildings jointly contain  of floor space and were completed in 1979 and 1980.
  Security and Emergency Response Training Center (SERTC): originally built as the PTACV maintenance facility in 1974 as a prefabricated metal building; training in hazardous material response began in 1985 and four more classrooms were added in 1995.
  Transit Maintenance Building (TMB): the original building completed in 1973 to support operations on the TTT, largely duplicating equipment and facilities from the URB.
  Urban Rail Building (URB): a  building within the TTT oval that has complete maintenance facilities for transit vehicles. The URB is the permanent maintenance facility for TTT, completed in 1980.
  Passenger Rail Services Building (PSB): completed as the Japan Rail Facility in 1999 and 2000, a prefabricated metal building; renamed to PSB during the completion of the second phase (2005–08) which added a high bay facility.

Rolling stock
In addition to its test tracks and laboratories, TTC also operates several locomotives, including:

Similar to DOT 004, DOT 005 and 006 also were ex-UP EMD GP9s (No. 147 and 162, respectively) that were sold to Precision National in 1979 and rebuilt for the Department of Transportation.

References

External links

Federal Railroad Administration Testing Facilities & Equipment
Transportation Technology Center, Inc.
Association of American Railroads

Rail transportation in Colorado
Railway test tracks
Transportation in Pueblo County, Colorado
1971 establishments in Colorado